Aviel Yosef Zargari (born 11 December 2002) is an Israeli footballer who plays as a midfielder for Maccabi Haifa and the Israel national team.

Early life
Zargari was born in Jerusalem, Israel, to a Sephardic Jewish family.

International career
He made his debut for Israel national football team on 9 June 2021 in a friendly against Portugal.

Career statistics

Club

Notes

References

2002 births
Living people
Israeli footballers
Footballers from Jerusalem
Beitar Jerusalem F.C. players
Maccabi Haifa F.C. players
Israeli Premier League players
Israeli people of Kurdish-Jewish descent
Israel youth international footballers
Israel international footballers
Association football midfielders